The State of Mississippi and the Face of Emmett Till is a 2003 play written by David Barr and Mamie Till Mobley. The show chronicles the life and brutal death of Emmett Till, and the circumstances that surrounded his murder.

Performances

Pegasus Players 

The show premiered in September 2003 at the Pegasus Players theatre in Chicago. Directed by Douglas Alan Mann, the play went on a national tour before closing.

Dillard University
The show premiered in February 2005 at Dillard University in New Orleans. Directed by Vergil Smith, Till ran for 13 performances before closing. The show was to return to Dillard's stage in February 2006, but due to damage suffered by Hurricane Katrina, it never did.

Nashville
It was performed at the Darkhorse Theater in Nashville in 2009.

Coppin State University
The show ran for a weekend at Coppin State University in Baltimore, Maryland during October 2005. Two actors were nominated for an Irene Ryan scholarship.

Grambling State University
It was performed at Grambling State University for Black History Month in 2011.

See also
 Civil rights movement in popular culture

References

2003 plays
American plays
Plays based on actual events
Emmett Till in fiction